Gustav Karl Girgensohn (1786-1872) was an Estonian botanist (bryologist); court counselor in Tartu.

Plant genus Girgensohnia is named after him.

References

1786 births
1872 deaths
19th-century Estonian botanists
Bryologists